Flesh and Spirit is a 2018 Chinese television series. It is based on the Chinese novel of the same name by Zhang Xianliang. The series is directed by Lou Jian and stars Yu Xiaowei and Sun Qian as the main characters. The 42 episode drama premiered on CCTV-8 on 17 June 2018. The series focuses on the life of Xu Lingjun, a sent-down youth in Helan Mountains during the Down to the Countryside Movement. The series was ranked first in the ratings in June 2018.

Cast

Main
 Yu Xiaowei as Xu Lingjun
 Sun Qian as Li Xiuzhi

Supporting
 Shang Tielong as Guo Shanzi
 Li Xinmin as Lao Baigan
 Huang Xiaolei as Huang Juhua
 Zhao Yi as Sun Jianli
 Wang Weiguang as Xie Goulai
 Zhao Ningning as Jiang Wenming
 Wang Quanyou as Cao Shouyi
 Tian Ling as Liang Dasang
 Wang Jingyun as He Lin
 Mu Huaihu as Laomei
 Wu Jian as Qian Youwei
 Zhang Hui as Hu Ziwen
 Qin Han as Xu Jingyou
 Qi Yunpeng as Dong Changsheng
 Hou Xuelong as Bai Yu
 Su Yueqing as Cao Binbin
 Teng Yufei as Zhang Mazi

Soundtrack

Ratings

References

2018 Chinese television series debuts
2018 Chinese television series endings
Television shows based on Chinese novels
Chinese period television series
Mandarin-language television shows
Television shows set in Ningxia